The discography of Finnish symphonic metal singer Tarja Turunen, consists of eight studio albums, one compilation album, four extended plays, fifty six singles and thirty nine music videos.

Turunen is best known as the former lead vocalist of the Finnish symphonic metal band Nightwish, which she founded with Tuomas Holopainen and Erno Vuorinen in 1996, being dismissed from the band on October 21, 2005. As part of Nightwish Turunen released five albums between 1997 and 2005, as well as three live albums, one extended play, two demo albums, six compilation albums, one box-set and fifteen singles (for further information see Tarja Turunen and Nightwish discography). Turunen started her solo career in 2006 when she released a Christmas album called Henkäys ikuisuudesta and toured Finland and Russia.

In 2007, Turunen released her second solo album, My Winter Storm, and in 2010, she released her third album, What Lies Beneath, Tarja had a cameo role in the Finnish film Yhtä Kyytiä (2011) before starting the What Lies Beneath World Tour, which lasted until April 8, 2012.  A live DVD, recorded in Rosario during the What Lies Beneath World Tour, was released on August 24, 2012. Turunen released her third rock album, Colours in the Dark, on August 30, 2013. Turunen released her first classical solo album Ave Maria – En Plein Air on September 11, 2015.

Studio albums

Rock/Heavy Metal albums

Classical albums

Christmas albums

Live albums

Video albums

Compilation albums

EPs

Singles

As lead artist

With Nightwish

Promotional singles with Nightwish

As a featured artist

Music videos

As lead artist

With Nightwish

Other

Collaborations

See also
 Nightwish discography

References

External links

 Tarja's Official Website

Discographies of Finnish artists
Heavy metal discographies